Ladelund is a municipality in the district of Nordfriesland, in Schleswig-Holstein, Germany.

History

From November 1, 1944 until December 16, 1944, a concentration camp was established near Ladelund. In the six weeks of being in production 301 people died through hard labour, starvation and infection diseases. Among the deaths were also 111 Puttenaren, men from the village Putten in the Netherlands, who got deported during the Putten raid because the action was undertaken as a reprisal for a Dutch resistance attack on a vehicle carrying personnel from the Wehrmacht. It was one of the worst raids in occupied Netherlands during the Second World War. Ladelund was a subcamp to the Neuengamme concentration camp.

See also
List of subcamps of Neuengamme

Notes

External links
Memorial Ladelund website

Municipalities in Schleswig-Holstein
Neuengamme concentration camp
Nordfriesland